Loanwords in Assyrian Neo-Aramaic came about mostly due to the contact between Assyrian people and Arabs, Persians, Kurds and Turks in modern history, and can also be found in the other two major dialects spoken by the Assyrian people, these being Chaldean Neo-Aramaic and Turoyo. Assyrian is one of the few languages where most of its foreign words come from a different language family (in this case, Indo-European).

Unlike other Neo-Aramaic languages, Assyrian has an extensive number of latterly introduced Iranian loanwords. Depending on the dialect, Arabic loanwords are also reasonably present. Some Turkish loanwords are Turkified words that are of Arabic origin. To note, some of the loanwords are revised (or "Assyrianized") and therefore would sound somewhat different to the original word. Furthermore, some loanwords may also have a slightly different meaning from the original language.

List

Below is a list of loanwords in Assyrian Neo-Aramaic, separated into sections based on the source language.

Notes:
 The source language itself may have borrowed the word from another language. These are noted in the "notes" sections.
 Vowels are typically "long" in an open syllable and "short" in a closed syllable; exceptions are noted by macrons on long syllables and breves on short ones.
 Stress typically falls on the penultimate syllable (exceptions are noted by acute accents). Monosyllabic words are also typically stressed.
 Geminated consonants are represented by a doubled letter.
 On transliteration:
 ʾ represents a plain glottal stop: .
 ʿ represents a pharyngealized glottal stop: .
 ḥ represents a voiceless pharyngeal fricative: .
 ġ represents a voiced velar fricative: .
 x represents a voiceless velar fricative:  or a voiceless uvular fricative: .
 q represents a voiceless uvular stop: .
 ḳ represents an unaspirated voiceless velar stop: .
 ṗ represents an unaspirated voiceless bilabial stop: .
 ṣ represents a pharyngealized voiceless alveolar fricative: .
 š represents a voiceless postalveolar fricative: .
 ž represents a voiced postalveolar fricative: .
 ṯ represents a voiceless dental fricative: .
 ṭ represents a pharyngealized voiceless alveolar plosive: .
 j represents a voiced postalveolar affricate: .
 č represents a plain voiceless postalveolar affricate: .
 č̣ represents an pharyngealized voiceless postalveolar affricate: .

Arabic

Persian

Kurdish

Turkish

Other
These foreign words are borrowed from European languages:

See also
 Chaldean Neo-Aramaic, a language (also considered a dialect of Assyrian) which also uses some of these loanwords.
 List of English words of Semitic origin
 List of loanwords in Classical Syriac
 Hybrid word
 Morphology
 Romanization of Syriac

References

Eastern Aramaic languages
Neo-Aramaic languages
Assyrian Neo-Aramaic
Persian words and phrases
Arabic words and phrases
Aramaic words and phrases
Turkish words and phrases
Arabization
Macaronic language